The 2022 Women's Junior European Volleyball Championship was the 28th edition of the competition, with the main phase (contested between 12 teams) held in North Macedonia (host city Skopje) from 27 August to 4 September 2022.

Qualification

Venues

Pools composition
The drawing of lots was held on 12 May 2022 and performed as follows:
Organiser, North Macedonia, were seeded in Pool I
The highest ranked participating team from the CEV European Ranking, Turkey, were seeded in Pool II
Remaining 10 participating teams drawn after they were previously placed in five cups as per their position in the latest European Ranking (winners of 3rd round qualification unknown at the time of the draw were placed in last pot)

Result

Squads

Preliminary round

Pool I

|}

|}

Pool II

 

|}

|}

5th–8th classification

5th–8th Semifinals

|}

7th place match

|}

5th place match

|}

Final round

Semifinals

|}

3rd place match

|}

Final

|}

Final standing

Awards

Most Valuable Player
  Julia Ituma
Best Setter
  Nina Mandović
Best Outside Spikers
  Karolina Staniszewska
  Aleksandra Uzelac

Best Middle Blockers
  Nausica Acciarri
  Hena Kurtagić 
Best Opposite Spiker
  Jovana Zelenović
Best Libero
  Manuela Ribechi

See also
2022 Men's U20 Volleyball European Championship

References

External links
Official website

Women's Junior European Volleyball Championship
Europe
Volley
Volley
Volleyball
International sports competitions hosted by North Macedonia